George Hoben Estabrooks (December 16, 1895 – December 30, 1973) was a Canadian-American psychologist and an authority on hypnosis during World War II. He was a Harvard University graduate, a Rhodes Scholar, and chairman of the Department of Psychology at Colgate University.  He used hypnosis to help spies have split personalities to not actually know they were spies in case of capture. He stated it was easy to create and easy to cure using hypnosis.

He joined the First Canadian Division in his teens and at the age of 19 became the youngest commissioned Officer. Later in life, he became a 32nd degree Knight Templar Mason and wrote various articles and books including these four publications: The Future of the Human Mind, Hypnotism, Spiritism, and Man - The Mechanical Misfit.

Estabrooks did experiments on children. He exchanged correspondence with then FBI Director Edgar Hoover about using hypnosis to interrogate juvenile delinquents. It is possible he used Manchurian Candidates in children.

Bibliography

Articles

Books

Conference proceedings
  285 pages. Papers of a symposium titled “Theory and Research Methodology in Specific Fields”, held at Colgate University on April 1–2, 1960.

Articles by other authors
  Obituary.

References

1895 births
1973 deaths
20th-century American psychologists
Harvard University alumni
American Rhodes Scholars
Colgate University faculty
Canadian emigrants to the United States
American hypnotists
Mind control theorists